Christophe Schmidt (born 15 June 1983 in Schliersee) is a German snowboarder. He competed in the men's halfpipe event at the 2006 Winter Olympics, where he placed eighth, and the 2010 Winter Olympics, where he placed twentieth.

References

1983 births
Living people
German male snowboarders
Olympic snowboarders of Germany
Snowboarders at the 2006 Winter Olympics
Snowboarders at the 2010 Winter Olympics
21st-century German people